Jeon Hye-weon (born April 02, 1998) is a South Korean actress. She is known for roles in television dramas such as Our Beloved Summer (2021–2022) and Love (ft. Marriage and Divorce) (2021).

Filmography

Film

Television series

Web series

References

External links 

 
 
 

1998 births
Living people
21st-century South Korean actresses
South Korean female models
South Korean television actresses
South Korean film actresses
South Korean web series actresses
Seoul Institute of the Arts alumni